Ferroviária can refer to:

 The Portuguese language word for railway employee
 Desportiva Ferroviária, a Brazilian football (soccer) club from Cariacica, Espírito Santo state;
 Associação Ferroviária de Esportes, a Brazilian football (soccer) club from Araraquara, São Paulo state;
 Ferroviária de Assis, a Brazilian football (soccer) club from Assis, São Paulo state;
 Ferroviária de Botucatu, a Brazilian football (soccer) club from Botucatu, São Paulo state;
 Ferroviária de Pinda, a Brazilian football (soccer) club from Pindamonhangaba, São Paulo state;
 Ferroviária Espírito Santo, a Brazilian football (soccer) club from João Neiva, Espírito Santo state;
 Ferroviária de Curitiba, a Brazilian football (soccer) club from Curitiba, Paraná state.